The Faculty of Medicine, Khon Kaen University is the fifth oldest medical school in Thailand located in Mueang Khon Kaen District, Khon Kaen Province, the second medical school to be set up in a region outside Bangkok and is the sixth oldest faculty of Khon Kaen University.

History 
The construction of the Faculty of Medicine was proposed in 1968 by Prof. Bimala Kalakicha to the council of Khon Kaen University. The proposal was passed on to the governmental cabinet and eventually made it into the 'Third National Economic and Social Development Plan' of 1972-1976. Construction received cabinet approval on 4 August 1972 and the faculty opened on 9 September 1972.The first cohort of medical students were admitted in 1974, selected from students in the Faculties of Science and Arts and consisted of 16 students. In 1973, a proposal was made to the cabinet requesting for assistance from the government of New Zealand in the construction of the university hospital.

The construction of the university hospital was initiated in 1973, designed by the British company Llewelyn-Davies Weeks Forester-Walkers and Bor. and construction by the New Zealand company Kingston Reynolds Thom & Allardice Limited (KRTA). On 19 February 1974, King Bhumibol Adulyadej, Queen Sirikit, Princess Sirindhorn and Princess Chulabhorn Walailak laid the foundation for the hospital and the hospital was named Srinagarind Hospital in commemoration of Princess Srinagarindra.The hospital was opened on 15 December 1983.

Departments 

 Department of Anesthesiology
 Department of Anatomy
 Department of Community Medicine
 Department of Forensic Medicine
 Department of Internal Medicine
 Department of Microbiology
 Department of Obstetrics and Gynaecology
 Department of Ophthalmology
 Department of Orthopaedics
 Department of Otolaryngology
 Department of Parasitology
 Department of Pathology
 Department of Paediatrics
 Department of Pharmacology
 Department of Physical Therapy
 Department of Physiology
 Department of Preclinical and Clinical Science
 Department of Psychology
 Department of Radiology
 Department of Rehabilitation Medicine
 Department of Surgery

Main Teaching Hospitals 

 Srinagarind Hospital , Khon Kaen Province
 Khon Kaen Hospital (CPIRD), Khon Kaen Province
Sunpasitthiprasong Hospital (CPIRD), Ubon Ratchathani Province
 Maha Sarakham Hospital (CPIRD), Maha Sarakham Province
 Udon Thani Hospital (CPIRD), Udon Thani Province

Affiliated Teaching Hospitals 
Nong Khai Hospital, Nong Khai Province
Chaiyaphum Hospital, Chaiyaphum Province
Kalasin Hospital, Kalasin Province

See also 

 List of medical schools in Thailand

References 

 Article incorporates material from the corresponding article in the Thai Wikipedia.

Medical schools in Thailand
Khon Kaen University
1972 establishments in Thailand
University departments in Thailand